Hsieh Yen-hsin (13 December 1929 – 11 July 2010) was a Taiwanese politician.

Early life and education
Hsieh Yen-hsin was born in 1929, and attended Kinki University in Japan. Hsieh's father was an employee of the Taiwan Sugar Corporation.

Political career
Hsieh led a military veterans' organization and the Liquid Gas Union of Changhua County. He was a member of the Changhua County Council from 1982 to 1990, then elected to two terms on the Taiwan Provincial Council between 1989 and 1998. He won a seat on the Legislative Yuan later that year, representing Changhua County on behalf of the Kuomintang until 2002.

Personal life
Hsieh Yen-hsin's son Hsieh Hsin-lung married . His grandchildren Hsieh Yi-fong and  have also held political office. Hsieh Yen-hsin died on 11 July 2010, aged 80.

References

1929 births
2010 deaths
Members of the 4th Legislative Yuan
Kuomintang Members of the Legislative Yuan in Taiwan
Changhua County Members of the Legislative Yuan
Taiwanese trade union leaders